Priscilla Hernández is a Spanish singer-songwriter and fantasy illustrator. Born in La Palma (Canary Islands), she is now based in Barcelona, Spain. She is also the founder of the independent record label Yidneth Records.

Priscilla's music can be classified as 'Ethereal gothic' or dark new age, based in the spectral spellbinding of fairytales, a concept that also nourishes her fantasy and fairy art as illustrator. She's also known as "Yidneth" which is not her artistic name but her comic project as an illustrator made in the late 1990s but unreleased. After some demos and collaborations in soundtracks and other CDs and projects, late 2006 she released her official debut album  "Ancient Shadows (the ghost and the fairy)", which compiles 19 of her songs as well as two booklets with her illustrations. The album won the award of "Best New Age Album" for the Independent Music Awards (IMAs) and best ambient song and album at JPfolks awards (Nashville) and she was also nominee as best new age vocalist in Los Angeles Music Awards. This project is specially inspired not only by the fantasy world of fairies and ghosts that inspires her artworks but also by the sleep paralysis disorder and hypnagogic and hypnopompic hallucinations occurring between dream and awareness and the strange states of mind that may take place during temporal lobe epilepsy. Her second album was released as an illustrated digibook late 2011.

Thanks to the company Faerieworlds, Priscilla premiered in the United States both in the West Coast (Faerieworlds) and East Coast (Faeriecon) along with bands like Qntal, Faun, Woodland and Trillian Green.  She also has appeared on the cover of Faerie Magazine.

Priscilla's music has been compared with Louisa John-Kroll, Enya, Bel Canto, and Sarah Brightman.

Music
2006 – Ancient Shadows
2011 –  The Underliving
2012 –  No matter what they say (single)
2013 –  The waking of the Spring 
2019 –  Flame (single)
2019 –  Nothing is Done Until It's Done (single)
2020 –  Surrender (single)
2021 –  Longing to Bloom (single)
‍

External sources
  Priscilla Hernandez Ancient Shadows press kit (pdf)
  Priscilla Hernandez The Underliving press kit (pdf)

References

  In depth review and interview in Musical discoveries

External links
OFFICIAL ARTIST SITE
OFFICIAL FAN CLUB SITE
Priscilla Hernandez videos
 Ancient Shadows project information
 The Underliving project information

Singers from the Canary Islands
Spanish women singers
Spanish songwriters
New-age musicians
Living people
Independent Music Awards winners
Year of birth missing (living people)
English-language singers from Spain